Club de Fútbol Intercity is a Spanish football team based in Alicante, in the Valencian Community. 

The club plays in the Primera División RFEF – Group 2, the third tier of Spanish football. 

They hold home games at the Estadio Antonio HDLR, which has a capacity of 2,500 spectators.

History
Intercity was created in 2017 by changing the structure of GCD Sant Joan d'Alacant.

In June 2018, after being promoted to Regional Preferente, the club aimed to play in Tercera División by merging with Novelda CF but the Royal Spanish Football Federation rejected this.

Also that month, Intercity announced its intention to be the first Spanish football club to be listed on the stock market.

In 2019, Intercity were promoted to Tercera División as regional champion, thus qualifying for the first time for the Copa del Rey. After beating UD Gran Tarajal in the preliminary round, the club faced Athletic Bilbao in the first round, losing 0–3.

Season to season

1 season in Primera División RFEF
1 season in Segunda División RFEF
2 seasons in Tercera División

Current squad

Reserve team

Out of loan

See also
CFI Alicante, reserve team

References

External links
Official website 

Football clubs in the Valencian Community
Association football clubs established in 2017
2017 establishments in Spain
Primera Federación clubs